Charles "Buddy" Wheatley is an American politician from the Commonwealth of Kentucky.  Wheatley serves as a member of the Kentucky House of Representatives for the 65th District.

In 2018, Wheatley ran for the House of Representatives, defeating Republican Jordan Huizenga.  In 2020, he ran for a second term, defeating Republican Jamir Davis. In 2022, Wheatley ran for a third term but lost to Republican Stephanie Dietz by a 51%-49% margin.

On December 20, 2022, Wheatley announced that he was running for Secretary of State in 2023.

Personal life

Wheatley graduated from the University of Kentucky with a bachelor's degree in Journalism in 1983 and an additional Bachelors of English from Northern Kentucky University (NKU) in 1997.  Wheatley went on to complete his Juris Doctor from Chase Law School at NKU while serving as a Fire Chief for Covington Fire Department in Covington, Kentucky, where he served for 20 years.

Wheatley is married to Judi Godsey; they have two children.

References 

Democratic Party members of the Kentucky House of Representatives
University of Kentucky alumni
Salmon P. Chase College of Law alumni
American fire chiefs
Year of birth missing (living people)
Living people